A Lecture on Camouflage is a 1944 American animated film directed by Chuck Jones. A Private Snafu cartoon short made for the troops during World War II.

Plot summary
 
Technical Fairy, First Class gives the troops "A Lecture On Camouflage" with the aid of Private Snafu. He points that modern camouflage, if used intelligently, is both an art and a science.

The camera shifts from the Fairy to what seems to be a small boat on wheels, traveling down a road. A gunsight shaped like a swastika targets the boat. A direct hit reveals the boat to be actually a jeep, driven by Snafu. The soldier takes cover in the nearby woods, but the Fairy reminds him to cover his tracks. After doing so, it is time for Snafu to relax. He smokes under the shade of a tree. He is not alarmed when the tree asks for a light, speaking in a German accent. The Fairy has to remind him that the enemy can use camouflage too.

Snafu sneaks away, but he is being followed by enemy soldiers posing as a tree, a tree stump, and a boulder. He runs to escape and ends up at the top of an enemy cannon. He is sent flying and then seeks shelter in the shade of another tree. The effect of the shifting sun tricks him into chasing the shadow around the tree. Next, a confused Snafu seeks shelter under another shadow. It turns out to be the shadow of a German observation balloon which drops a bomb on Snafu. This concludes his story.

The camera shifts back to the Fairy, who points that to fool the enemy, one must blend in with the natural surroundings. He demonstrates by joining two topless mermaids.

Cast
Mel Blanc as Technical Fairy - First Class / German Soldier / German General

Soundtrack
 "Powerhouse" (Music by Raymond Scott)
 "I'm Ridin' For a Fall" (by Frank Loesser)

Analysis
The gag with the enemy soldier disguised as a tree can be traced back to Shoulder Arms (1918). It was also used in Commando Duck (1944).

Sources

See also
Private Snafu
List of SNAFU shorts

References

External links

1944 films
1944 animated films
American animated documentary films
Short films directed by Chuck Jones
American black-and-white films
Private Snafu
Articles containing video clips
Films scored by Carl Stalling
Films produced by Leon Schlesinger
1944 documentary films
1944 comedy films
1940s Warner Bros. animated short films
1940s English-language films
American short documentary films